Showtunes is a live album by Tommy Keene. It came out in 2000 on the Parasol Records label. Along with in-concert versions of original compositions, the album includes a cover version of Mission of Burma's "Einstein's Day".

Track listing
All songs by Tommy Keene, except where noted.
"Astronomy"/"This Could Be Fiction" – 6:10
"Long Time Missing" – 4:34
"Nothing Can Change You" – 3:48
"Silent Town" – 4:45
"Underworld" – 5:33
"Going Out Again" – 2:11
"Paper Words and Lies" – 3:17
"My Mother Looked Like Marilyn Monroe" – 4:04
"Einstein's Day" – 4:30 (Roger Miller)
Originally recorded by Mission of Burma, 1982
"Highwire Days" – 3:39
"When Our Vows Break" – 4:03 (Keene, Jules Shear)
"Compromise" – 3:21
"Based on Happy Times" – 3:51
"Back to Zero Now" – 3:24
"Places That Are Gone" – 16:42

Personnel

Musicians
Tommy Keene – Vocals, guitar
Steve Gerlach – Guitar
Scott A. Johnson – Guitar
Brad Quinn – Bass guitar, back-up vocals
John Richardson – Drums

Production
Mike Leach – Engineer
Jonathan Pines – Mastering, mixing
Adam Schmitt – Mastering

Managerial and design
Ed Morgan – Management
Tommy Keene – Photography
Marvin Forte – Graphic Design

Tommy Keene albums
2000 live albums